The Zhurihe Training Base, also called the Zhurihe Combined Tactics Training Base, is a People's Liberation Army (PLA) base in Inner Mongolia, China, founded in 1957. General Secretary and Chairman Xi Jinping commemorated the 90th anniversary of the PLA with a military parade at Zhurihe. The PLA has called Zhurihe their "most modernized training base" and say it is the largest in Asia. Comparisons have been made between Zhurihe and Fort Irwin in California, United States.

Zhurihe is home to the 81st Army Group. The base is overseen by the PLA's Beijing Military Area Command.

The base features a variety of mock facilities including highways, an airstrip, a town center with buildings—one of which closely resembles the Presidential Office Building in Taipei, Taiwan—and a near-replica of the Eiffel Tower. Many of these structures were built between 2013 and 2015.

In July 1997, the Central Military Commission designated Zhurihe to be modernized and turned into a training base for China. The PLA opened the base to foreign armed forces for the first time on August 25, 2003.

References

Military installations of China
Military education and training in China
Inner Mongolia